Martin Joseph Léonard Bresso (born 12 May 1985), better known by his stage name Tchami, is a French record producer and DJ from Paris. A founding member of the Pardon My French collective, he is best known for his solo work and regarded as a pioneer of the future house genre alongside Dutch DJs Oliver Heldens and Don Diablo.

When asked about the origins of his name Tchami, the French artist explained, "I used to travel a lot across Europe and Africa these past five years. Tchami is a name that has been given to me in Africa which is an honor. Fortunately it sounded catchy to me, so I kept it. That's all folks."

Tchami often performs with the persona of a priest and a church theme. He wears a clerical collar and includes visuals such as an altar and stained glass windows. In an interview he explained that "it is my message, being spiritual. I think my music is about that too.".

Musical style 
Tchami most commonly produces music he has called future house.  Tchami has since explained that future house was in some ways, just a tag for his music on SoundCloud as a way to stand out.   In an interview with Complex Media, Tchami said

Career

2013–2014

On 5 December 2013, Tchami released his first EP "Promesses"  for free under the Fool's Gold Records label. Both of the EP's tracks were re-released as singles; "Shot Caller" on 17 December 2014, and "Promesses" on 4 January 2015 under Ministry of Sound, which features vocals from Kaleem Taylor. The latter peaked at number 7 on the Official Singles Chart. On 18 April 2014, Tchami released his debut single "Untrue" under the Spinnin' Records label. Tchami had co-wrote DJ Snake's and Lil Jon's hit single "Turn Down for What".

2015–present 
He launched his own record label, called Confession.

On 12 March 2015, he announced his debut extended play titled After Life. He uploaded his new song "After Life" featuring vocals from Stacy Barthe and is part of the After Life EP along with "Missing You", which has also been released by Tchami and AC Slater. In October 2015, Tchami and fellow electronic producer DJ Snake were injured in a car crash. Consequently, both artists missed a scheduled performance at Toronto's Monster Mash festival. His remix of AlunaGeorge's "You Know You Like It" was featured in the soundtrack of the 2015 movie "We Are Your Friends".

After an 8-month break following the After Life EP, Tchami released "Siaw" on his own record label Confession as a free download on 18 August 2016. The track was an experimental bass house influenced track which sampled KRS-One's Step Into A World (Rapture's Delight). He then went on to release his only single of 2016, "Prophecy", on 20 September 2016. The track was a collaboration with mysterious Parisian producer Malaa, and again featured a more experimental bass house element compared to much of Tchami's earlier work.

On 3 February 2017, Tchami released "Adieu", widely believed the 1st single of his rumoured upcoming second EP. The track was once again experimental, this time calmer than much of Tchami's earlier work. Tchami also released "World To Me" featuring London singer MNEK on Spotify, however the track was quickly made private although not taken down for unknown reasons. The track was included in his second EP, "Revelations EP", with new vocals from Luke James, alongside Adieu, Taiki Nulight collaboration "Godspell" (previously known among the dance music community unofficially as "Godspeed" and "Fallin"), "Zeal", "Adieu, Pt. ll" and a Kaelyn Behr collaboration "Don't Let Me Down". The Revelations EP was released on 25 August 2017.

His first full-length album, titled "Year Zero" was announced in the first half of 2020. Some singles from the album and other songs he released in 2020 include "Proud" featuring vocals by Daecolm, "Ghosts" featuring vocals by HANA, "Buenos Aires", "Born Again", "Faith" featuring vocals sampled from Marlena Shaw, and "Praise" featuring vocals by Gunna (rapper). In 2020, he also released a remix for Justin Martin's song "Stay" featuring vocals from Dalilah.

Pardon My French 

He is currently part of the Pardon My French team, a collective of four French DJs composed of DJ Snake, Mercer, Malaa and himself. Throughout the year 2016 and early 2017, DJ Snake did a world tour with Pardon My French Tour with Tchami and Mercer.

Confession 
In 2015, Tchami announced that he would be launching a new record label called "Confession". Throughout late 2018 Tchami toured North America with other DJs signed to the Confession label for the Confession tour.

Discography

Live performances

Something Wicked
 29 October 2017 - Sam Houston Race Park Houston, TX
 28 December 2017 - Shaw Conference Centre Edmonton, Alberta

Decadance 2017
 30 December 2017 - Colorado Convention Center, Denver, CO

No Redemption Tour (Tchami and Malaa)
 10 November 2017 - World Market Center Las Vegas, NV
 11 November 2017 - Shrine Expo Hall Los Angeles, Ca
 17 November 2017 - Electric Factory Philadelphia, PA
 18 November 2017 - The Tabernacle Atlanta, GA
 22 November 2017 - City National Civic San Jose, CA
 24 November 2017 - Rebel Toronto, Canada
 25 November 2017 - New City Gas Montreal, Canada
 1 December 2017 - Brooklyn Hangar Brooklyn, NY
 2 December 2017 - Echostage Washington, DC
 8 December 2017 - The Fillmore Miami, FL
 9 December 2017 - Aragon Ballroom Chicago, IL

CRSSD Festival
 4 March 2018 - Waterfront Park, San Diego, CA

EDC Mexico 2018
 24 February 2018 - Autódromo Hermanos Rodríguez, Mexico City, Mexico

Tchami x Malaa
 24 March 2018 - Ultra Music Festival, Miami, FL
 4 May 2018 - Bill Graham Civic Auditorium, San Francisco, CA
 11 May 2018 - Red Rocks Amphitheatre, Morrison, CO
21 July 2018 - Parookaville, Weeze, Germany 
 30 December 2018 - Rhythm & Vines, Gisborne, New Zealand
 3 July 2019 - Balaton Sound, Zamárdi, Hungary
7 July 2019 - Electric Love, Salzburg, Austria
20 July 2019 - Parookaville, Weeze, Germany
 21 July 2019 - Sunrise Festival, Kołobrzeg, Poland
26 July 2019 - Tomorrowland, Boom, Belgium
 25 August 2019 - Mysteryland, Haarlemmermeer, Netherlands
 30 December 2019 - SnowGlobe Festival, Lake Tahoe, CA
 31 December 2019 - Resolution Festival NYE, WaMu Theater, Seattle, WA

Coachella Valley Music and Arts Festival
16 & 23 April 2016 - Indio, California
11 & 18 April 2020 - Indio, California (Postponed / Cancelled)

Ultra Music Festival

 24 March 2017 Mainstage Miami, FL
 24 March 2018 Live Stage Miami, FL
30 March 2019 Mainstage Miami, FL
26 March 2022 Mainstage Miami, FL

DJ Magazine Top 100 DJs

References

21st-century French musicians
French dance musicians
French DJs
Living people
Musicians from Paris
Future house musicians
1985 births
Electronic dance music DJs